Quercus sagrana, also spelt Quercus sagraeana, the Cuban oak, is a medium-sized evergreen tree native to western Cuba in the Cuban pine forests ecoregion. It is the only oak native to the Caribbean.

Taxonomy 
The Cuban oak was first described by Nuttall in 1842 as Quercus sagraeana based on the specimen collected by Ramón de la Sagra. Article 60.8(c) of the International Code of Nomenclature for algae, fungi, and plants provides that where personal names end in -a, the adjectival form of the specific epithet is formed by adding -n- plus the appropriate gender ending. The International Plant Names Index has corrected Nuttall's sagraeana to sagrana in accordance with this article.

Using the same specimen, but apparently unaware of the original name, Richard (1853) named the Cuban oak Q. cubana. Trelease (1924) did not view Q. sagrana as a species in its own right but as a variety of Q. virginiana. He proposed the name Q. virginiana var. sagrana. Muller (1961) renamed it Q. oleoides var. sagrana, hypothesizing that the Cuban oak population was a subspecies of Q. oleoides, originating from the Yucatán region of Mexico, but with introgression from Q. geminata coming from Florida. He considered the morphologically variable Cuban population a hybrid swarm that had stabilized and was distinct from the other live oaks of the Virentes. A recent study of molecular genetic variation and taxonomically informative leaf morphology shows that the Cuban oak shows little evidence of hybrid origin and is most similar to Q. virginiana, but distinct enough to be regarded as a separate species, Q. sagrana. It is placed in section Virentes.

See also

 Cuban pine forests

References

sagrana
Endemic flora of Cuba
Trees of Cuba
Flora without expected TNC conservation status